Omphalina is a species of fungus in the family Tricholomataceae, and the type species of the genus Omphalina. It is found in North America and Europe.

References

External links

Tricholomataceae